Ronaldo Vieira (born 10 August 1990) is a former Brazilian professional footballer who played as a midfielder.

Career

College and Youth
Vieira played four years of college soccer, beginning at Framingham State University in 2010, before transferring to Sacred Heart University in the Spring of 2012.

While at college, Vieira also appeared for USL PDL club GPS Portland Phoenix in 2012 and Western Mass Pioneers in 2012 and 2013.

Fort Lauderdale Strikers
After taking part in an open tryout, Vieira signed his first professional contract with NASL club Fort Lauderdale Strikers on 10 April 2014.

On June 1, 2014, Vieira made his professional debut, replacing Iván Guerrero as a 76th-minute substitute during a 0–3 loss away to New York Cosmos. On July 26, 2014, Vieira made his first professional start, receiving a red card as the Strikers drew 1–1 against New York Cosmos. In addition to his four league appearances that season, Vieira appeared in a 2–3 loss to the Laredo Heat in the U.S. Open Cup.

Personal life

In 2017, Vieira co-founded FC Flair, a Massachusetts youth futsal academy, with Bruno Bonicontro, a teammate from Boston City FC. He currently serves as Director of Operations.

Vieira is the head coach of the Beaver Country Day School boys varsity soccer team. In 2021, the team won the Eastern Independent League title.

References

External links 
 Fort Lauderdale Strikers Profile.
 Boston City FC Profile.

1990 births
Living people
Brazilian footballers
Brazilian expatriate footballers
GPS Portland Phoenix players
Western Mass Pioneers players
Fort Lauderdale Strikers players
Association football midfielders
Expatriate soccer players in the United States
USL League Two players
North American Soccer League players
National Premier Soccer League players
Boston City FC players